Wipeout is an American television game show hosted by John Cena, Nicole Byer, and Camille Kostek which premiered on TBS on April 1, 2021. It is a reboot of ABC's Wipeout which ran from 2008 to 2014. The series was renewed for a second season in May 2021.

Production 
In April 2020, it was announced that the original Wipeout series would be rebooted by TBS. In September 2020, John Cena, Nicole Byer, and Camille Kostek were announced as hosts of the show.

On February 11, 2021, it was announced that the series would premiere on April 1, 2021. The first episode also re-aired the following day on TBS's sister network, The CW. On May 19, 2021, it was announced that the reboot series was renewed for a second season.

On October 19, 2021, it was announced that new episodes of the first season would resume on January 11, 2022.

Episodes

Awards and nominations

International broadcast 
The show also airs in the United Kingdom on E4, Southeast Asia on AXN, and Canada on CTV Comedy.

References

External links 
 
 

2020s American comedy game shows
2020s American reality television series
2021 American television series debuts
Television series reboots
Television series by Banijay
English-language television shows
TBS (American TV channel) original programming
Wipeout (Endemol TV series)